USS San Diego (LPD-22), a , is the fourth ship of the United States Navy to be named for San Diego, California.

Construction

Ship's name
Secretary of the Navy Gordon R. England named the San Diego on 30 April 2004:

The city is the home of Naval Base San Diego, the Navy's largest base in the Pacific, and Marine Corps Recruit Depot San Diego, the United States Marine Corps' west coast recruit training center.

San Diego keel was laid down on 23 May 2007, at Northrop Grumman's Ingalls shipyard in Pascagoula, Mississippi. 
She was launched on 7 May 2010, and christened on 12 June, sponsored by Linda Winter, wife of former Navy Secretary Donald C. Winter.

On 1 October 2011, it was announced that San Diego had completed her builders trials, including tests of her defensive, communications, propulsion, and other auxiliary systems, leaving only the repair of issues that arose in the builders trials and thereafter Navy Acceptance Trials before delivery. Her acceptance trials were completed on 17 November, ahead of her delivery to the Navy on 19 December.

Commissioning
San Diego departed Pascagoula on 15 March 2012 and arrived at Naval Station Guantanamo Bay, Cuba, on 19 March for a three-day layover on her way to San Diego. San Diego passed through the Panama Canal on 25 March. She arrived in San Diego on 6 April. San Diego was commissioned on 19 May 2012, in a ceremony at the Navy Pier (next to the USS Midway Museum) in San Diego.

Operational history

In late 2014, San Diego operated with the  Amphibious ready group in the United States Fifth Fleet area.

Incidents

Coronavirus pandemic 

On , The San Diego Union-Tribune reported that sailors of San Diego had stated, on condition of anonymity, that at least five sailors from their ship had tested positive for COVID-19 during the preceding few days.  The sailors had been interviewed by the Union-Tribune presumably regarding a fire aboard nearby amphibious assault ship .  In response, a Navy spokesperson confirmed that two sailors who were part of the firefighting effort had tested positive for the virus.

The two sailors had shown symptoms of the disease.  One was part of a crew fighting the fire, and the other had been acting as support.  One sailor who fought in the fire stated that the fire had destroyed much of Bonhomme Richard'''s firefighting gear, so the gear of nearby ships, including that of San Diego'', was being used, and sailors fighting the fire often swapped gear with each other.  In addition, 27 close contacts had been identified and placed in quarantine.

Notes

References

External links 
 Official page 

 
 

 

San Antonio-class amphibious transport docks
2010 ships